Gayle Edlund Wilson (born November 24, 1942) is an American business professional, community activist, and the former First Lady of California (1991–1999). She is married to former California Governor and Senator Pete Wilson, with whom she has two sons.
 
As an activist, Wilson has concentrated her efforts on improving early childhood health and  encouraging children in the areas of math and science.

As a young teenager in February 1956, Wilson acted in a professional production of A Room Full of Roses opposite Linda Darnell at the Sombrero Playhouse in her native Phoenix. Wilson competed in the 1960 National Science Talent Search and is a member of the Society's Honorary Board.

First Lady of California
As California's First Lady, Wilson worked to further her husband's goals of promoting early childhood education. She also helped establish a merit-based California state summer school for math and science, now known as COSMOS.  Each summer this four-week residential program located on four University of California campuses serves over 600 high school aged students.

Post Sacramento
Wilson currently serves as a member of the board of directors of Gilead Sciences, Inc. and the Ralph M. Parsons Foundation.  She is a member of the Board of Trustees of California Institute of Technology and Sanford-Burnham Institute for Medical Research, and she is the chairman of the Advisory Board and primary fundraiser for COSMOS.  She is a former member of the board of ARCO as well as of the Center for Excellence in Education.

Wilson is a past president of the Junior League of San Diego as well as a founding member of the San Diego chapter of ARCS (Achievement Rewards for College Scientists).

As a young woman Wilson earned national recognition as one of the top 40 finalists of the Westinghouse Science Talent Search (now the Intel Science Talent Search). She then furthered her academic career at Stanford University, where she earned a degree in biology and a Phi Beta Kappa key.

Since 2011, Wilson has been on the selection committee for the GE Reagan Scholarships.

Wilson has two sons and one grandchild.

References

External links
Forbes Profile of Gayle Wilson
Gilead Sciences Profile of Gayle Wilson

 

1942 births
Living people
People from Phoenix, Arizona
First ladies and gentlemen of San Diego
First Ladies and Gentlemen of California
Stanford University alumni
American health activists
Activists from California
California Republicans